Hossein Salami (born in 1960) is an Iranian military officer with the rank of major general, who is the commander-in-chief of the Islamic Revolutionary Guard Corps (IRGC).

Early years
Salami was born in 1960 in Golpayegan, Isfahan province, Iran. In 1978, he was accepted in the mechanical engineering department at the Iran University of Science and Technology. When the Iran–Iraq War started, he joined the IRGC. After the war, he continued his study and graduated with a Master's degree in defense management.

Career

On 21 April 2019, Ali Khamenei appointed Salami as the new Commander-in-Chief of the IRGC, replacing Mohammad Ali Jafari who had held the post since September 2007.

On 20 June 2019, Salami became internationally known when the IRGC downed a US surveillance drone.

On 7 January 2020, Salami spoke at the funeral of his comrade in arms and IRGC Quds force subordinate, Qasem Soleimani, who had been killed the previous Friday near Iraq's Baghdad International Airport by a US airstrike: "I say the last word at the beginning: we will take revenge. We will take revenge, a revenge that will be tough, strong, decisive and finishing, and will make them regret."

In the matter of 8 January 2020 shootdown of UIA flight PS752 due to IRGC missiles, on 13 January Salami went to the Iran Parliament and said "We did made a mistake. Some of our compatriots were martyred because of our mistake but it was unintentional... In my all lifetime I haven't been as sorry as much as now. Never... I wish I had been on board and burned with them... May God forgive us and then after than Iranian people and the families of the victims forgive us. And we for this incident, we were determined all the more to make it up."

On 5 March 2020, Salami said, referencing COVID-19, that "We are now dealing with a biological war." He argued that it "may be the product of American biological warfare." This theory was amplified on 8 March by the state-run Press TV.

Sanctions
According to the United Nations Security Council Resolution 1747, sanctions were imposed on Salami on March 2007.

On 8 April 2019, the US inflicted economic and travel sanctions on the IRGC and organizations, companies, and individuals affiliated with them. Salami said the IRGC was proud that Washington named them as a terrorist group. It was later remarked that Salami was included on the sanctions list as he had been promoted on 21 April commander of the IRGC.

On 3 October 2022, Salami was included in a Canadian sanctions list that included 9 Iranian entities, and 25 senior officials. The sanctions came in reaction to the Death of Mahsa Amini, and the persecution of protestors in the widescale protests that ensued.

Responsibilities
 Commander of IRGC University of Command and Staff (1992–1997)
 Operations deputy of IRGC Joint Staff (1997–2005)
 Commander of IRGC Air Force (2005–2009)
 Academic staff of Supreme National Defense University
 Deputy commander of Islamic Revolutionary Guard Corps (2009–2019)
 The commander-in-chief of the IRGC (2019–)

Personal life
Salami's brother, Mostafa Salami, is a senior officer in the armed force. He is also an authority of Khatam-al Anbiya Construction Headquarters.

Views
Salami stands out among the commanders of the Revolutionary Guards for his fiery and aggressive speeches targeting the US, Israel and Saudi Arabia.

In January 2019 Salami said: “We will fight them on the global level, not just in one spot. Our war is not a local war. We have plans to defeat the world powers.”

See also 
 List of Iranian two-star generals since 1979
 List of senior officers of the Islamic Revolutionary Guard Corps

References

1960 births
Living people
Iran University of Science and Technology alumni
Islamic Revolutionary Guard Corps major generals
Islamic Revolutionary Guard Corps personnel of the Iran–Iraq War
People from Golpayegan
Iranian individuals subject to the U.S. Department of the Treasury sanctions